The Bates-Geers House, also known as Geers House, is a historic home located near Plato, Texas County, Missouri. It was built about 1840, and is a two-story, five bay, Greek Revival style frame dwelling with a rear ell.  It sits on a sandstone foundation and features massive sandstone end chimneys.

It was listed on the National Register of Historic Places in 1982.

References

Houses on the National Register of Historic Places in Missouri
Greek Revival houses in Missouri
Houses completed in 1840
Houses in Texas County, Missouri
National Register of Historic Places in Texas County, Missouri